The white-tipped sicklebill (Eutoxeres aquila) is a species of hummingbird in the family Trochilidae. It is found in Colombia, Costa Rica, Ecuador, Panama, Peru, and Venezuela.

Taxonomy and systematics

The white-tipped sicklebill shares the genus Eutoxeres with the buff-tailed sicklebill (E. condamini). It has three subspecies, the nominate E. a. aquila, E. a. salvini, and E. a. heterurus.

Description

The white-tipped sicklebill's most prominent feature is its strongly decurved bill that arcs through a quarter circle; the maxilla is black and the mandible yellow. The sexes are alike in plumage. Adults' upperparts are green, their throat and chest blackish, and the rest of the underparts striped green and white. The tail is mostly green, with the outer pair of feathers more dusky with white tips. Juveniles appear scaly.

Distribution and habitat

The northernmost subspecies of white-tipped sicklebill, E. a. salvini, is found in Costa Rica, Panama, and western Colombia. E. a. heterurus is found from Colombia's Cauca Department south through western Ecuador, and there is also at least one record in Mérida of western Venezuela. The nominate E. a. aquila is found from eastern Colombia south through eastern Ecuador into northern Peru. The species inhabits the understory of montane evergreen forest.

Behavior

Feeding

The white-tipped sicklebill primarily feeds on nectar. Its curved bill is an adaption to the shape of flowers, especially those of genera Centropogon and Heliconia, and it typically clings to the flower as it feeds. It is a "trap-line" feeder, visiting a circuit of flowering plants and not defending any particular area. Sicklebills also feed on insects by gleaning them from spiderwebs or trunks and branches.

Breeding

Male white-tipped sicklebills display for females in leks with a U-shaped flight; they are polygynous. The species' breeding seasons vary across its range and it appears to often breed twice per year. The female builds a cup nest that hangs from the underside of Heliconia or larger leaves, and sometimes from human structures such as bridges and the ceilings of buildings. The nest is woven from rootlets, hair, fungal rhizomes, and plant fibers bound with spider web. The clutch size is two eggs.

Vocalization

The white-tipped sicklebill's song is "a complex series of thin, whiny squeaks followed by some strident, high, tseep notes." There appears to be some geographic variation in it. One description of its call is "high, thin, sharp piercing tsitting notes".

Status

The IUCN has assessed the white-tipped sicklebill as being of Least Concern, though its population has not been quantified and its trend is not known. It is "a forest-dwelling species that depends on flowers for nectar, and so could be threatened by forest fragmentation."

References

white-tipped sicklebill
Birds of Costa Rica
Birds of Panama
Hummingbird species of Central America
Birds of Colombia
Birds of Ecuador
Birds of Peru
white-tipped sicklebill
Taxonomy articles created by Polbot